Ross Dufty (13 August 1927 – 4 August 2009) was an Australian cricketer. He played two first-class matches for Tasmania between 1953 and 1961.

See also
 List of Tasmanian representative cricketers

References

External links
 

1927 births
2009 deaths
Australian cricketers
Tasmania cricketers